Regent Taipei is a hotel in Zhongshan District, Taipei, Taiwan. It opened in 1990 as the Regent Taipei, and later became the Grand Formosa Regent before reverting to its current name. It is owned and operated by Taiwan-based FIH Regent Group.

History 
Regent Taipei was conceptualised in 1973 by Formosa International Hotels founder, S.R. Pan, upon the need for a luxury hotel in Taipei. This was later realised in 1984 when Y.H. Chen of Tuntex Group cooperated with Pan to build this hotel. An agreement with Regent International Hotels was signed the same year to manage the hotel. The hotel opened in 1990 as The Regent Taipei. In 2011, the hotel name was reverted to Regent Taipei after being titled Grand Formosa Regent for 17 years.

Restaurants and shops 
The hotel is home to Azie Grand Cafe, one of the eight restaurants housed within Regent Taipei. The restaurant is known for its beef noodles which was claimed to be one of the best by the Taipei Beef Noodle Festival as well as CNN Travel in 2015.

Regent Galleria 
Regent Galleria occupies a two-story space that occupies the entirety of the hotel's basement. It features boutiques such as Chanel, Chopard, Harry Winston, Bulgari, Hermés, Bottega Veneta, Loro Piana, Louis Vuitton and Bang & Olufsen.

In popular culture 
The hotel's lobby, entrance and its Presidential Suite were featured in 2014 film Lucy by Luc Besson.

See also 
 Grand Hotel Taipei
 Hotel Metropolitan Premier Taipei
 Regent International Hotels

References 

1990 establishments in Taiwan
Hotels established in 1990
Hotels in Taipei